Dieter Hegen (born April 29, 1962 in Kaufbeuren, West Germany) is a retired professional ice hockey player who played in the Eishockey-Bundesliga and its replacement the Deutsche Eishockey Liga.

Playing career
Hegen began playing for his hometown ESV Kaufbeuren in 1979.  Hegen was drafted 46th overall by the Montreal Canadiens in the 1981 NHL Entry Draft but never signed a contract and remained with Kaufbeuren until 1985 when he joined Kölner EC, winning the Bundesliga championship in 1987 and 1988.  In 1989 he moved to for Düsseldorfer EG and in a three-year spell he won three more Bundesliga titles.  In 1992, he joined EC Hedos München and won his sixth and final Bundesliga title with the team in 1994, which turned out to be the last year of the Ice Hockey Bundesliga as it was replaced with the Deutsche Eishockey Liga.  The team also changed its name to Maddogs München for the inaugural DEL season which turned out to be their only season as they would fold on December 18, 1994, just 27 games into the 44 game season.  Hegen would re-join DEG and went to win the DEL championship in 1996.  In 1998, he moved to Star Bulls Rosenheim.  In 2000, Rosenheim left the DEL and Hegen decided to drop two divisions to the Oberliga and re-join ESV Kaufbeuren.  He remained with the team until his retirement in 2002.

International career
He was a member of the German 1984 Canada Cup and competed in five Winter Olympics in 1984, 1988, 1992, 1994 and 1998. His appearance at the 1998 Olympics made him, along with Raimo Helminen (Finland) the third and fourth hockey players to ever compete at five Winter Olympics, after Udo Kießling (Germany) and Petter Thoresen (Norway).

Career statistics

Regular season and playoffs

International

External links
 

1962 births
Düsseldorfer EG players
ESV Kaufbeuren players
German ice hockey left wingers
Ice hockey players at the 1984 Winter Olympics
Ice hockey players at the 1988 Winter Olympics
Ice hockey players at the 1992 Winter Olympics
Ice hockey players at the 1994 Winter Olympics
Ice hockey players at the 1998 Winter Olympics
IIHF Hall of Fame inductees
Kölner Haie players
Living people
Mad Dogs München players
Montreal Canadiens draft picks
Olympic ice hockey players of Germany
Olympic ice hockey players of West Germany
People from Kaufbeuren
Sportspeople from Swabia (Bavaria)
Starbulls Rosenheim players
West German ice hockey left wingers